The Loo Sanction is a 1973 sequel novel to The Eiger Sanction written by Trevanian.

Plot
In London, England, Jonathan Hemlock is blackmailed into performing another "sanction", a top-secret political assassination.

Critical reception
Some critics derided The Loo Sanction and The Eiger Sanction as "pale James Bond derivatives" while Trevanian considered the books intentional Bond spoofs.

References

External links
The Loo Sanction at Trevanian.com
The Loo Sanction at Google Books

English-language novels
Sequel novels
1973 American novels
American thriller novels
Works published under a pseudonym
Novels set in London
Novels set in England
Avon (publisher) books